Ex Nihilo is a fictional character appearing in American comic books published by Marvel Comics.

Publication history
Ex Nihilo first appeared in Avengers vol. 5 #1 (December 2012) and was created by Jonathan Hickman and Jerome Opeña.

Fictional character biography
Ex Nihilo was one of the Gardeners carried along with his sister Abyss as an egg by an Aleph (a species of robotic creatures created by the Builders). In accordance with their mission as creations of the Builders, Aleph taught them to transform into perfect creatures any species they encountered. Ex Nihilo, Abyss, and their Aleph arrived on Mars where they terraformed it to contain a breathable atmosphere and vegetation. After Ex Nihilo shot an Origin Bomb at Earth to accelerate the evolution of mankind, which affected almost two million people, the Avengers scrambled a response team. Not interested in fighting, Ex Nihilo tried to accelerate Iron Man's evolution so that he no longer needed an exoskeleton. When Black Widow and Hawkeye retaliated, Ex Nihilo became angry and attacked them. During the brawl, Ex Nihilo, Abyss, and the Aleph defeated the Avengers and imprisoned them. A helpless Captain America was sent back to Earth as a message. Awakening three days later, Captain America implemented the Avengers initiative called "Wake The World" which initiated the team's most massive assemblage to date. Ex Nihilo's intervention started being "world-razing" for the Aleph which would force him to destroy the Earth if Ex Nihilo failed to polish this planet. Captain America and those that are part of the "Wake the World" initiative arrived as soon as Ex Nihilo's first human was fully developed. He and his allies fought the Avengers until they noticed the presence of the latest Captain Universe. Ex Nihilo and his allies recognized her as a power beyond them they must obey. Captain Universe ordered Ex Nihilo and Abyss to stop their crossing to transform and/or destroy "imperfect" worlds. However, the Aleph resisted and was finally destroyed by the heroine. Before returning to Earth, the Avengers established that Ex Nihilo could reform Mars as he pleased as long as he did not interfere with Earth.

Ex Nihilo creates Nightmask, an artificial human, on the terraformed surface of the planet Mars. After a fierce battle with the Avengers, Nightmask is taken to Earth and given residence in Avengers Tower.

Nightmask and Star Brand later head to Mars to confront Ex Nihilo.

Omega Flight is sent in by Department H to investigate one of the Origin Bomb sites left by Ex Nihilo in Regina, Saskatchewan, Canada. Validator is changed by the Origin Bomb site while the rest of the Omega Flight members are killed in action.

Some children of the Zebra People in the Savage Land have gotten exposed to the Origin Site placed by Ex Nihilo and had been evolved by it.

Ex Nihilo reveals that in the case of Earth, he did not just transform the life inhabiting it but attempted to rouse the consciousness of the planet itself.

In a prelude to the Infinity storyline, Ex Nihilo, Abyss, Nightmask, and Star Brand join the Avengers. After the fight against the Builders and Thanos, Ex Nihilo joins his brethren who endeavor to recreate life on worlds ravaged by the war of the Builders.

During the Time Runs Out storyline, Ex Nihilo and his fellow Gardeners attempted to fix the decaying universe that was the result of the contraction of the Multiverse. Once on Earth, Ex Nihilo and the Gardeners were able to see its whole system and find that Earth has scars. They were offered by Sunspot a one-way trip to help his branch of the Avengers investigate the origin of this decay by using A.I.M. technology and travel across the Multiverse. Sunspot's Avengers branch traveled across numerous universes navigating the map left by the Mapmakers. After one last jump across universes that cost Nightmask's life, Sunspot's Avengers branch found themselves face to face with a fissure in time and space. From it, two Beyonders emerged and demanded the heroes to fall back. Upon denying their request, Sunspot's Avengers faced the Beyonders. In an attempt to reprogram one of the Beyonders, Ex Nihilo, Abyss, and rest of the Gardeners sacrificed themselves.

Powers and abilities
Ex Nihilo has the power to create new life and modify existing life forms on a planetary scale like control the movement and growth of the plants and transform organic life. Ex Nihilo can also fire energy blasts, exhale fire from his mouth, and has advanced longevity.

Other versions 
In "What If...Thanos had joined the Avengers", Ex Nihilo appears with the Avengers fighting the Builders.

In other media

Merchandise 
Hasbro released an Ex Nihilo action figure as part of Guardians of the Galaxy Marvel Legends line.

References

External links
 Ex Nihilo at Marvel Wiki
 Ex Nihilo at Comic Vine

Avengers (comics) characters
Characters created by Jonathan Hickman
Comics characters introduced in 2012
Fictional characters with plant abilities
Fictional characters with slowed ageing
Marvel Comics aliens
Marvel Comics plant characters